Senator O'Sullivan may refer to:

Matt O'Sullivan (born 1978), Australian Senate
Patrick B. O'Sullivan (1887–1978), Connecticut State Senate
Thomas C. O'Sullivan (1858–1913), New York State Senate

See also
Senator Sullivan (disambiguation)